François Barois (1656–1726) was a French sculptor.

Barois was born and died in Paris.  While residing at the French Academy in Rome he produced a copy of the Kallipygian Venus for King Louis XIV of France, working on it from 1683 to 1686. His Cleopatra Dying was his reception piece for the Académie royale de peinture et de sculpture in 1700; it is now in the Musée du Louvre. Three more of his works are also now at the Louvre: Spring and Authumn (therm figures) and Pomona.

Barois was among the large team of sculptors delivering decorative vases and other sculptural elements for the gardens of Versailles.

Notes

External links 

 Cleopatra Dying, by François Barois, Louvre website
  Works by François Barois on the Louvre collections database

1656 births
1726 deaths
17th-century French sculptors
French male sculptors
18th-century French sculptors
Artists from Paris
18th-century French male artists